Primer Amor A 1000 X Hora is the soundtrack to the telenovela Primer amor... a mil por hora. It was released in 8 May 2001.

Track listing

2000 albums